Cruse is an unincorporated community in Clay County, Illinois, United States. Cruse is located along a railroad line west-southwest of Iola.

References

Unincorporated communities in Clay County, Illinois
Unincorporated communities in Illinois